The Snedecor Award, named after George W. Snedecor, is given by the Committee of Presidents of Statistical Societies to a statistician for contribution to biometry.

Winners

 1977: A. P. Dawid
 1978: Bruce W. Turnbull
 1979: Ethel S. Gilbert
 1981: Barry H. Margolin
 1982: Byron J. T. Morgan
 1983: D. S. Robson
 1984: Stuart H. Hurlbert
 1985: Mitchell H. Gail
 1986: Scott L. Zeger
 1987: George E. Bonney
 1988: Cyrus R. Mehta
 1989: Barry I. Graubard
 1990: Kenneth H. Pollock
 1993: Kenneth L. Lange
 1995: Norman E. Breslow
 1997: Michael A. Newton
 1999: Daniel Scharfstein
 2001: Patrick J. Heagerty
 2003: Paul R. Rosenbaum
 2005: Nicholas P. Jewell
 2007: Donald Rubin
 2009: Marie Davidian
 2011: Nilanjan Chatterjee
 2013: Jack Kalbfleisch
 2015: Danyu Lin
 2017: Aurore Delaigle
 2019: Sudipto Banerjee
 2021: David Dunson

See also

 List of mathematics awards

External links 
 Snedecor Award website

Statistical awards
Awards established in 1976